Gauss's diary was a record of the mathematical discoveries of German mathematician Carl Friedrich Gauss from 1796 to 1814.

Sample entries

Most of the entries consist of a brief and sometimes cryptic statement of a result in Latin.

Entry 1, dated 1796, March 30, states "", which records Gauss's discovery of the construction of a heptadecagon by ruler and compass.

Entry 18, dated 1796, July 10, states  "ΕΥΡΗΚΑ! " and records his discovery of a proof that any number is the sum of 3 triangular numbers, a special case of the Fermat polygonal number theorem.

Entry 43, dated 1796, October 21, states "Vicimus GEGAN" (We have conquered GEGAN). The meaning of this was a mystery for many years.  found a manuscript by Gauss suggesting that GEGAN is a reversal of the acronym NAGEG standing for Nexum medii Arithmetico-Geometricum Expectationibus Generalibus and refers to the connection between the arithmetic geometric mean and elliptic functions. 

More precisely, Gauss observed that if a+bi is a (Gaussian) prime and a–1+bi is divisible by 2+2i, then the number of solutions to the congruence 1=xx+yy+xxyy  (mod a+bi), including x=∞, y=±i and x=±i, y=∞, is (a–1)2+b2.

References
 

History of mathematics
Mathematics literature
Number theory